Mattenenglisch, in Bernese German Dialect Mattenänglisch, is a name for the varieties traditionally spoken in the Matte, the old working class neighbourhood of the Swiss City of Bern. It is used in two different senses: Either for the traditional sociolect of that neighbourhood or for a special kind of Pig Latin that was used there. In the second half of the 20th century, both have fallen out of use because after the traditional social stratification has been completely changed, the Matte is no longer a working-class neighbourhood. However, there are voluntary associations that cultivate Mattenenglisch.

Mattenenglisch sociolect
The Mattenenglisch sociolect was the working class variety of the Bernese German dialect. It had a characteristic vocabulary that was partly influenced by varieties such as Rotwelsch, Jenisch or Yiddish, because people wanted to communicate in a way the police would not understand. While most Mattenenglisch words have fallen out of use, some have spread into common Bernese German usage, thus becoming shibboleths of Bernese German, for instance the words jiu 'yes', Modi 'girl' or Gieu 'boy'.

Mattenenglisch Pig Latin
Until the mid 20th century, a special variety of Pig Latin was used by the kids in the Matte neighbourhood. Unlike in other varieties of Pig Latin, the first vowel of the word is completely substituted.

The rules are as follows:

For words that begin with consonant sounds, move the initial consonant or consonant cluster to the end of the word, add ee and change the first vowel into i. Examples:
 Mueter 'mother' → Ieter-mee
 gib-ere 'give-her' → ibere-gee
 Schnure 'mouth' → Ire-schnee
For words that begin with vowel sounds, add the syllable ee to the end of the word, or hee if the word ends in a vowel, and change the first vowel into i. Examples:
 Änglisch 'English' → Inglisch-ee
 Öpfu 'apple' → Ipfu-hee

External links
Matteänglisch-Club Bärn (Bern Mattenenglisch Club – the site is in German and Bernese German)
Mattenenglisch, an explanation with examples (in German).

Culture in Bern
Cant languages
Language games
Slang
City colloquials